Choi Tae-jin (born May 14, 1961) is a South Korean footballer.

He graduated in Korea University, and played for Daewoo Royals and LG Cheetahs.

Honours

Player
Lucky-Goldstar Hwangso
 K-League Winners (1) : 1990

Individual
 K-League Best XI (1) : 1990

External links
 

K League 1 players
Busan IPark players
FC Seoul players
South Korean footballers
1966 births
Living people
Korea University alumni
Association football midfielders